Nugent Herrmann Welch  (30 July 1881 – 16 July 1970) was a notable New Zealand artist. He was born in Akaroa, New Zealand, in 1881. He was appointed an Officer of the Order of the British Empire in the 1949 King's Birthday Honours for services to art in New Zealand.

References

External links
New Zealand History biography of Nugent Welch
Archives New Zealand biography of Nugent Welch

1881 births
1970 deaths
New Zealand artists
New Zealand war artists
People from Akaroa
New Zealand Officers of the Order of the British Empire